Shri Chitrapur Math is the central math (community temple) for the Chitrapur Saraswat Brahmin sect. It has been located at Shirali in the Bhatkal Taluk in the North Kanara district of Karnataka since 1757. The other maths of the community are located in Gokarna, Karla, Mangalore and Mallapur. All of the maths have the insignia of the saffron flag.

The chief deity worshipped in the math is Shri Bhavanishankar, a form of Shiva. The other 6 sanctorums of the temple are of the Samadhis of the previous GuruSwami's of the community. Daily puja is carried out at the shrine of Bhavanishankar as well as the other Swamijis.

 Shri Sadyojat Shankarashram Swamiji is the head of the math, having ascended the Peetha in February 1997. Shree Sadyojat Shankarashram Swamiji is the eleventh of this lineage of Gurus which began in 1708.

History

Swami Parijnanashram I is believed to have been a direct avatar of Shiva himself and he came down from somewhere in the North (probably Varanasi). Not many details are known about this Swami, since record-keeping within the math started in about 1722.

Swami Shankarashram hailed from the Harite family. He was consecrated by Shri Parijnanashram Swami in 1720 (Sharvari Chaitra Sh-15). He attained mahasamadhi in 1757 (Ananda, Phalgun Sh-5).

At this point the issue of location of his Samadhi came up, and the Nagarkatti family offered their house in Chitrapur, Shirali for construction of the Samadhi and the Temple, which stands till today.

Shri Shankarashram-I had not adopted any disciple which caused some concern as to the continuity of this lineage. The threat of property takeover by the regional authorities loomed large over the Math, and a member of the Pandit family was considered a worthy person for this position. He was ordained Shri Parijnanashram-II. He adopted a disciple from the priestly family of Shukla, assigning him the name of Shri Shankarashram-II, and spent his life in Kollur in Dhyan (intense meditation), though he often visited Shirali. His Samadhi is located to the right of the Main Samadhi at Shri Chitrapur Math, Shirali..

The samadhi of Swami Shankarashram-II is located in Mallapur.

The disciple chosen by him hailed from the Talgeri family and was given the name of Shri Keshavashram. He began acquiring land and other agricultural assets for the math.

Swami Keshavashram ordained a young disciple once again from the Shukla family under the name Shri Vamanashram, who entrusted day-to-day matters of the math to the priests. He attained mahasamadhi in Mangalore. A disciple adopted by him from the Nagarkar family was ordained for Sannyasa under the title of Shri Krishnashram.

During the reign of Shri Krishnashram most of the disciples were brought round from Vaishnava practices, land was purchased and reforms introduced. The Rath Utsava (chariot festival) was started. He was a scholar in Sanskrit and the shastras. The disciple ordained by him was Shri Pandurangashram.

Shri Pandurangashram, of the Nagarkar family, was the eighth sant, and reigned for over fifty years. He was ordained into Sanyasa at 12 years of age and was trained under the Guruswami for five years. The greater part of the math was rebuilt and all the Samadhis of his predecessors were reconstructed with silver under this tutelage. He built a school, a post office and other structures of necessity in the village. He was a scholar of Vedic astrology and the Vedas. He attained mahasamadhi in 1915.

The peetha was then ascended by Shri Anandashram Swamiji, who hailed from the Haridas Family. He was ordained hardly 8 days prior to the mahasamadhi of Shri Pandurangashram Swamiji. Since his initiation in Sanyasa took place at very early age, he was not able to be personally guided by the Guruswami. He improved the financial position of the math, which had dwindled during his early years, by making payments of vantiga (donations) almost mandatory. He reigned for 51 years and traveled widely. He attained mahasamadhi in Bangalore in 1966.

A disciple was adopted by Sri Anandashram Swamiji in 1959, once again from the Shuklakar family. His name was Swāmi Parijnānāshram III. He restarted the Rathotsava  since it had been discontinued by previous Swamis for financial reasons. He collected antiques and artifacts to set up a museum. He started a school for the disabled in Bolinj at Virar near Mumbai.

Swāmi Parijnānāshram III attained mahasamadhi in Bangalore in 1991. His Samadhi is located at Karla near Lonavla in Maharashtra. The samadhi enclave also contains a temple of Goddess Durga Parmeshwari and Shree Ganesha just like the other Swamijis.

Shree Sadyojat Shankarashram Swami 

The previous Swamiji had not adopted a disciple (shisya). But some members of the community found out that a Saraswat youth had taken Sannyas and was in Mount Abu. They requested him to ascend the Peetha; he agreed, and became the 11th Guru.

Lineage of Swamis
The lineage of all Swamis of this Math is called The Guru Parampara.

Parijnanashram-I Swamiji (1708–1720)
Shankarashram-I Swamiji (1720–1757)
Parijnanashram-II Swamiji (1757–1770)
Shankarashram-II Swamiji (1770–1785)
Keshavashram Swamiji (1785–1823)
Vamanashram Swamiji (1823–1839)
Krishnashram Swamiji (1839–1863)
Pandurangashram Swamiji (1863–1915)
Anandashram Swamiji (1915–1966)
Swāmi Parijnānāshram III (1966–1991)
Sadyojat Shankarashram Swamiji (1997-)

References

All these books are internal publication and are available with the Chitrapur Math 
Kanara Saraswat
Guru-Parampara - The Book
50 Years of Bliss, Gopal S Hattiangdi, Bombay, 1965. via https://web.archive.org/web/20191118100127/http://www.chitrapurebooks.com/
Interview with Chitrapur Math Managers and Staff

Also Read
Gaudapadacharya
Govinda Bhagavatpada
Adi Shankaracharya
Shri Gaudapadacharya Math

External links
https://web.archive.org/web/20190927092700/http://www.kanarasaraswat.in/
http://www.chitrapurmath.net
https://web.archive.org/web/20191118100127/http://www.chitrapurebooks.com/

Hindu temples in Uttara Kannada district
Konkani
Hindu monasteries in India